The Line 2 of the Metro of Seville will span the city from east to west, connecting the neighbourhoods of La Cartuja and Torreblanca.

Description 
Line 2 is still in the planning phase. Through a tunnel, it will travel the city from east to west. The line will begin in the neighbourhood of Torreblanca and will proceed to pass through Sevilla Este and el Palacio de Congresos, Montesierra, Tesalónica (with a line 4 connection expected), Kansas City, the central station of Santa Justa, José Laguillo (a planned line 3 station), la Plaza del Duque, the Plaza de Armas bus station, before finally crossing the river to Torre Triana (a planned line 4 station). The line will not have a direct transfer with line 1.

This line is of vital importance in terms of the trajectory that it spans, especially since it passes beneath the historic centre of the city and connects the international bus station of Plaza de Armas with the central railroad station of Santa Justa. Consequently, it has been though necessary to advance the modernization of the existing metro and railway installations, thereby providing a direct connection between the international bus station and the high velocity train (AVE) station of Santa Justa. It is estimated that the depth of the central segment will be more than 50 metres.

General characteristics expected 
Method of construction: Tunnel boring machine, cut and cover, and surface.
Underground: 9,650 m
Street level: 3,920 m
Average depth: 25 m
Estimated cost: Between €1,032,000 and €1,233,000.
Municipalities served: One
Districts spanned: Five
Population served:
Annual users: Approximately 19,600,000
Daily users: Approximately 65,376

Stations 

Seville Metro
Rapid transit lines in Spain